Below is an incomplete list of diplomats from the United Kingdom to Saxony, specifically Heads of Missions.

Heads of Missions

Envoys Extraordinary and Ministers Plenipotentiary

Elector of Saxony
1693: Sir William Dutton Colt Two Special Missions
1693–1698: George Stepney Three Special Missions: 1693–1694 as Commissary and Deputy; 1695 as Minister; 1698 as Envoy Extraordinary

Elector of Saxony and King of Poland
1698 to 1763: The Elector of Saxony was usually also King of Poland: no separate mission to Saxony: see List of Ambassadors from the United Kingdom to Poland

Elector of Saxony
1764–1768: Philip Stanhope
1769–1771: Robert Murray Keith (the younger)
1771–1775: John Osborne
1775–1783: Sir John Stepney, Bt
1782: Viscount Dalrymple (did not go)
1783–1791: Morton Eden
1791–1803: Hugh Elliot
1803–1806: Henry Williams-Wynn
1806–1816: No diplomatic relations

Kingdom of Saxony
1806–1816: Henry Williams-Wynn
1816–1824: John Morier
1824–1828: George Chad
1828–1832: Edward Ward
1832–1858: Hon. Francis Forbes
1858–1859: Augustus Paget
1859–1866: Hon. Charles Murray
1866–1867: John Lumley
1867–1874: Joseph Hume Burnley
1873–1897: George Strachey
1897–1901: Sir Alexander Condie Stephen
1901–1907: Hugh Gough, 3rd Viscount Gough 
1907–1909: Mansfeldt Findlay
1909–1914: Arthur Grant Duff

References

Saxony

History of Saxony